The Baku City Circuit is a motor racing street circuit located in Baku, Azerbaijan constructed near Baku Boulevard. The inaugural Formula One race at the circuit was the 2016 European Grand Prix and its support events. A year later, in 2017, the circuit held the inaugural Azerbaijan Grand Prix. The event is organised by Baku City Circuit Operation Company.

History

Development
However, in July 2014 it was announced that the race's debut would be delayed until 2016.

Design

The , anti-clockwise layout of the circuit was designed by circuit architect Hermann Tilke. The circuit starts adjacent to Azadliq Square, then loops around Government House before heading west along a  straight to the Palace of the Shirvanshahs and Maiden Tower. Here, the track has a narrow  uphill traversal and then circles the Old City before opening up onto a  stretch along Neftchilar Avenue back to the start line. The circuit's tight layout through urban parkland shares similarities with the Montjuïc circuit which hosted the Spanish Grand Prix in the 1970s.

The 2016 GP2 race, which was in support of the 2016 European Grand Prix, saw 12 out of 22 drivers fail to finish. Valtteri Bottas set a new unofficial Formula 1 top speed record in qualifying for the 2016 European Grand Prix when Williams claimed to have data showing him reaching , eclipsing the previous record of  set in 2005 by Juan Pablo Montoya for McLaren while testing at Autodromo Nazionale di Monza.

Pirelli found that 90% of the rear tyres used in free practice for the 2016 Grand Prix had been cut by the bolts securing kerbs to the ground not being drilled into the ground far enough, while Jenson Button and Nico Rosberg expressed concern over the lack of run-off areas which would be dangerous in the case of an incident such as a high speed puncture or mechanical failure. Valtteri Bottas was forced to miss the whole of Free Practice 3 when a drain cover came loose and caused significant damage to his Williams FW38. Similarly, the first practice session of the 2019 Azerbaijan Grand Prix was cancelled when George Russell hit a loose drain cover. Many drivers praised the circuit for the challenge offered by its mixture of long straights, slow technical sections and no margin for error due to the proximity of the walls. In 2021, Rosberg criticised the location of the pit lane entrance adjacent to the  main straight, calling it "one of the places I always found the most dangerous of the whole year". Formula One race director Michael Masi disagreed with Rosberg, saying the venue "fulfils all of the various safety requirements that the FIA has within its regulation requirements.".

Arif Rahimov dismissed from post of Executive Director of Baku City Circuit, he has worked in this position for the past 7 years. Magsud Farzullayev was appointed as an acting executive director.

Lap records

The official race lap records at the Baku City Circuit are listed as:

See also
 European Grand Prix
 Azerbaijan Grand Prix

Notes

References

External links

Official website 

Formula One circuits
Motorsport venues in Azerbaijan
Sports venues in Baku
Buildings and structures in Baku
European Grand Prix
Azerbaijan Grand Prix
Tourist attractions in Baku
Racing circuits designed by Hermann Tilke
2016 establishments in Azerbaijan